The Camden 28 were a group of leftist, Catholic, anti-Vietnam War activists who in 1971 planned and executed a raid on a draft board in Camden, New Jersey, United States.  The raid resulted in a high-profile criminal trial of the activists that was seen by many as a referendum on the Vietnam War and as an example of jury nullification.

The goal
The goal of the group was to make a bold statement in opposition to the war in Vietnam by way of sabotaging the portion of the draft process that was administered through the local draft board in Camden.  Their plan was to break into the draft board offices at night and search for, collect, and either destroy or remove the records of all Class 1-A status draft registrants.  It was to be both a symbolic and real blow to the process through which tens of thousands of young American men were being drafted and sent to fight in Vietnam.

They wrote in a statement before trial:

We are twenty-eight men and women who, together with other resisters across the country, are trying with our lives to say "no" to the madness we see perpetrated by our government in the name of the American people – the madness of our Vietnam policy, of the arms race, of our neglected cities and inhuman prisons. We do not believe that it is criminal to destroy pieces of paper which are used to bind men to involuntary servitude, which train these men to kill, and which send them to possibly die in an unjust, immoral, and illegal war. We stand for life and freedom and the building of communities of true friendship. We will continue to speak out and act for peace and justice, knowing that our spirit of resistance cannot be jailed or broken.

The group
The mostly Catholic group included four priests and a Protestant minister, people working in education or legal and social services, veterans, and middle-aged parents. One notable member was Frank Pommersheim. Two members of the Citizens' Commission to Investigate the FBI were also involved.

Informant
One group member, Bob Hardy, was opposed to the war but was also secretly opposed to the group's plans to break the law with this action.  Feeling torn between loyalty to his friends in the group and his strict law-and-order personal philosophy, Hardy approached the local FBI with his concerns.  The FBI encouraged Hardy to remain with the group so that he could pass along information about their activities.  Hardy agreed to become an informant, allegedly only after receiving assurances from his FBI handlers that none of the group would ever spend any time in jail for the raid against the draft board.  The FBI agreed to finance much of Hardy's role within the group.

As an FBI informant, Hardy became heavily involved with the group from a planning and training perspective.  As he was a hands-on carpenter and handyman, he helped devise the plan whereby the group could break into the Federal office building within which the draft board was located.  He supplied tools (mostly paid for by the FBI), expertise and training.  Ladders would be used, windows would be cut with glass cutters, alarms would be bypassed, etc.  2-way radios were supplied by the FBI so that the activists could better communicate and coordinate their actions when the raid was to finally occur.

Raid
The raid was planned for the early hours of Sunday, August 22, 1971.  With the activists all in their positions the raid commenced.  Unknown to the activists, the raid was being carefully monitored and documented from the shadows by more than 40 FBI agents.  The FBI agents held back and watched as the activists broke into the draft board office and commenced destroying and bagging thousands of draft-related documents.  After a significant amount of time passed during which thousands of documents had been handled, the hidden FBI agents were ordered to spring into action and arrest everyone involved.  Those arrested, including two Catholic priests and a Protestant minister, became known as the Camden 28. The fact that Bob Hardy had betrayed the activists became readily apparent as the night wore on.

Trial

By the time that the Camden 28 were brought to trial in the Spring of 1973, their case was viewed by many as a referendum on the Vietnam War.  Each of the 28 faced seven felony charges stemming from the raid and more than 40 years in prison if convicted.  The 28 chose to be tried together.

Immediately prior to the trial they were offered a plea-bargain whereby they would each plead guilty to a single misdemeanor charge and the rest of the charges would be dropped.  After intense discussion the 28 decided that they would not take the plea and that as political activists they preferred to be put on trial. Historian Howard Zinn was brought in to testify on behalf of the defendants.

Unfortunately for the prosecution, its star witness Bob Hardy had begun having second thoughts, and felt betrayed by the government. Hardy maintained that from the start of his interaction with the FBI he sought and received assurances that none of his co-conspirators in the raid would see any jail time.  Now, as the trial loomed ahead, each of the "28" was facing more than 40 years in prison.

For the FBI and the prosecution, the cost of betraying Hardy in this fashion was to lose him as a friendly witness.  Scorned, Hardy would now, in fact, testify extensively for the defense.  Hardy would testify regarding the extent to which the FBI encouraged and enabled the raid on the draft board to take place.  Through Hardy's testimony, the raid came across as being funded and driven by the FBI, and the defense was able to argue effectively that through the FBI, the government "over-reached" in its zeal to arrest and prosecute this particular set of anti-war activists.

Additionally, it became apparent that the FBI had enabled the plot to form and develop because it believed the Camden group might have been connected to the theft and publication of FBI documents in Media, PA several months prior. In fact, at least two of the Camden defendants (Keith Forsyth and Robert Williamson) had been involved in the Media burglary, though this was not revealed until they stepped forward in 2014. Those documents had revealed the COINTELPRO program, and the Camden defendants essentially used their own trial to publicize and question FBI methods.

On May 20, 1973, the jury returned "not guilty" verdicts for all counts against all 28 defendants, acquitting them. Howard Zinn had testified at the trial and recommended civil disobedience and jury nullification. Nearly 50 years after breaking into the Camden draft board and destroying records to protest the war in Vietnam, WHYY documents members of the Camden 28's reunion as they took to the stand in the federal courtroom where they were tried.

Documentary
A 2007 documentary film, The Camden 28, has been researched, produced and released by Anthony Giacchino, combining archival footage, contemporary photographs, extensive interviews and analysis into the most comprehensive account of the people, events and history surrounding the Camden 28.  The Camden 28 aired in September, 2007 on PBS's P.O.V. independent documentary showcase.

Legacy
Supreme Court Justice William Brennan called the trial, "one of the great trials of the 20th century". Father Michael Doyle, one of the 28 who was a Catholic parochial vicar in Camden at the time, remained a priest and community leader there until his death in 2022. Sacred Heart Church, which Doyle led until his retirement, continues to campaign for peace, equality, and social justice and holds an annual Peace Gathering.

See also
1971 May Day Protests
Catholic Worker Movement
Catonsville Nine
Chicago Seven
Harrisburg Seven
Milwaukee Fourteen
Chicano Moratorium
Gainesville Eight
The Camden 28 - a documentary film about the group
Christian left
 Lists of protests against the Vietnam War#1970

References

External links
The Camden 28 - official website for a 2007 documentary about the incident.
About the Camden 28 - PBS

History of Camden, New Jersey
Opposition to United States involvement in the Vietnam War
1971 in New Jersey
American anti–Vietnam War activists
Anti–Vietnam War groups
Protests against the Vietnam War
Riots and civil disorder in New Jersey
Jury nullification
Left-wing militant groups in the United States
Christian radicalism